Tomas Kristian Galvez (born 28 January 2005) is a Finnish professional footballer who plays as a left-back for Manchester City. Born in England, he plays for the Finland national team.

Career
Galvez is a youth product of Watford and after 5 years with them moved to the youth academy of Manchester City in 2021. He has played for them up to U23 level. In July 2022, he signed his first professional contract with the club.

International career
Born in England, Galvez is of Spanish descent through his father and Finnish descent through his mother. He opted to represent Finland’s national football team internationally, having represented them at various youth levels. He made his international debut with the senior Finland national team in a friendly 2–0 loss to Sweden on 9 January 2023.

References

External links
 
 Man City profile

2005 births
Living people
Footballers from Greater London
Finnish footballers
Finland international footballers
Finland youth international footballers
English footballers
Finnish people of Spanish descent
English people of Finnish descent
English people of Spanish descent
Manchester City F.C. players
Association football fullbacks